The 1964 Ole Miss Rebels football team represented the University of Mississippi during the 1964 NCAA University Division football season. The Rebels were led by 18th-year head coach Johnny Vaught and played their home games at Hemingway Stadium in Oxford, Mississippi. The team competed as members of the Southeastern Conference, finishing in seventh. 
The Rebels were the preseason favorite to win the national title, starting the season ranked first in the nation. The Rebels soon fell out of the rankings, however, after a loss to Kentucky in the second game of the year (the AP Poll ranked only the top 10 teams from 1962 to 1967). The Rebels' fall to seventh place in the conference was the school's first finish outside the conference's top four since 1950. They finished the regular season with a 5–4–1 record, tied for 20th in the final Coaches Poll, conducted before bowl season. They were invited to the 1964 Bluebonnet Bowl, where they lost to Tulsa.

Schedule

Personnel

References

Ole Miss
Ole Miss Rebels football seasons
Ole Miss Rebels football